Edgardo Díez (born 18 April 1961) is a Puerto Rican fencer. He competed in the individual foil event at the 1984 Summer Olympics.

References

1961 births
Living people
Puerto Rican male fencers
Olympic fencers of Puerto Rico
Fencers at the 1984 Summer Olympics